The London Conference on the Illegal Wildlife Trade was an international conference held on 12–13 February 2014 in London. A declaration to protect wildlife was signed by 46 countries and 11 international organizations. The declaration calls for increasing enforcement of laws against poaching, reducing demand for wildlife products, and the "sustainable utilization" of wildlife.

It was held again 11–12 October 2018.

References

External links
 

International conferences in the United Kingdom
2014 in the United Kingdom
Conferences in London
2014 conferences